Mamestra is a genus of moths of the family Noctuidae described by Ochsenheimer in 1816. Perhaps the best known species is the cabbage moth, M. brassicae.

Species
 Mamestra brassicae (Linnaeus, 1758)
 Mamestra configurata Walker, 1856
 Mamestra curialis (Smith, 1888)
 Mamestra repentina Morrison, 1875
 Mamestra tayulingensis Yoshimoto, 1989

References

 
Hadenini